Black Hole is a pinball game released in 1981 by Gottlieb. It is notable for having two playfields: one on top with a conventional slope, and one mounted underneath, sloping away from the player. It has no connection with the 1979 film of the same name.

Description
Black Hole was the first machine to feature a lower playfield viewed through a window in the upper playfield. It was touted as the highest-grossing pinball game of all time shortly after its release, partly due to (or despite) the fact that it was the first pinball game which cost 50¢ to play (although many argue that Williams Black Knight, and Firepower were already at 50¢ before the release of Black Hole). Black Hole's robotic speech is generated by a Votrax SC-01.

Features
2 playfields
6 flippers
6 pop bumpers
4 drop target banks
1 spinner
Rotating disc animated backglass
Infinity backglass lighting
Multiball
Speech (Votrax SC-01)

Game quotes
 "Do you dare to enter the Black Hole?"
 "Re-entry attempt has FAILED."
 "No one escapes the Black Hole!"
 "Captured."
 "Re-entry success."

Design team
 Game Design: Adolf Seitz Jr., John Buras
 Artwork: Terry Doerzaph

Reception 
In Japan, Game Machine listed Black Hole on their June 1, 1983 issue as being the eighth most-successful flipper unit of the year.

Appearances in pop culture 
 Black Hole in the films Les Compères (1983), Strange Brew (1983), Next Of Kin (1989).
 The phrase "Do You Dare To Enter The Black Hole?" which the machine says during attract mode was etched in the vinyl runout grooves on LP versions of the band Hovercraft's 1997 album, Akathisia.

Digital versions
Black Hole is available as a licensed table of The Pinball Arcade for several platforms. The game is also included in the Pinball Hall of Fame: The Gottlieb Collection.

References

External links
 Internet Pinball Database entry for Black Hole

1981 pinball machines
Gottlieb pinball machines